Charlie Baggett (born January 21, 1953), also known as Charles Baggett, is an American football coach and former player.

Early life and playing career
Baggett was born on January 21, 1953, in Fayetteville, North Carolina. He attended E. E. Smith High School in Fayetteville, before enrolling at the University of North Carolina at Chapel Hill. Baggett later transferred to Michigan State University where he played quarterback on the football team. In 1974, he helped lead Michigan State to a 7-3-1 record while throwing for 965 yards with 10 TD.  He would also run for 748 yards and 11 TD that year while masterminding an option offensive attack.  His senior year in 1975 was a bit of a disappointment; despite going 7-4 he threw for just 854 yards with 4 TDs while rushing for 645 yards and 7 TDs. Baggett played one season (1976) with the CFL's Hamilton Tiger-Cats.

Coaching career
Baggett served as wide receivers and running backs coach of the Bowling Green Falcons from 1977 to 1980 and wide receivers coach of the Minnesota Golden Gophers from 1981 to 1982, before being named wide receivers and running backs coach of the Michigan State Spartans. His first coaching job in the National Football League was with the Houston Oilers from 1993 to 1994. He later returned to Michigan State, staying there from 1995 to 1998. In 1999, he returned to the NFL as wide receivers coach of the Green Bay Packers, later holding the same position with the Minnesota Vikings and later became assistant head coach and offensive coordinator and wide receivers coach of the Miami Dolphins. From 2007 to 2008 he was wide receivers coach of the Washington Huskies before returning once again to the NFL in the same position with the St. Louis Rams. In 2010, he was hired as assistant head coach and wide receivers coach of the Tennessee Volunteers.

Personal life
Baggett is married with one child.

References

1953 births
Living people
American football quarterbacks
Bowling Green Falcons football coaches
Green Bay Packers coaches
Houston Oilers coaches
Miami Dolphins coaches
Michigan State Spartans football coaches
Michigan State Spartans football players
Minnesota Golden Gophers football coaches
Minnesota Vikings coaches
St. Louis Rams coaches
Tennessee Volunteers football coaches
Washington Huskies football coaches
University of North Carolina at Chapel Hill alumni
Sportspeople from Fayetteville, North Carolina
Players of American football from North Carolina